The Star Dust Trail is a 1924 American silent drama film directed by Edmund Mortimer and starring Shirley Mason, Bryant Washburn and Thomas R. Mills. It was produced on a budget of $40,000, but its worldwide box office was disappointing leading to a loss of $17,000 for the studio.

Cast
 Shirley Mason as Sylvia Joy 
 Bryant Washburn as John Warding 
 Thomas R. Mills as Horace Gibbs 
 Richard Tucker as John Benton 
 Merta Sterling as The Maid 
 Shannon Day as Nan Hartley 
 Marion Aye as Girl

References

Bibliography
 Solomon, Aubrey. The Fox Film Corporation, 1915-1935: A History and Filmography. McFarland, 2011.

External links
 

1924 films
1924 drama films
1920s English-language films
American silent feature films
Silent American drama films
Films directed by Edmund Mortimer
American black-and-white films
Fox Film films
1920s American films